St. Mary's Gardens is an Oakland, California elderly housing facility noted for its airy, open design and innovative use of low-cost plywood. 

The building was designed by Thomas J. Caulfield of Peters, Clayberg, and Caulfield. The design received a national Honor Award from the American Institute of Architects in 1981.

Buildings and structures in Oakland, California